The Scotland national under-16 football team represents Scotland in international football at the under-16 age level. It is controlled by the Scottish Football Association, the governing body for football in Scotland.

Competitive record

FIFA U-16 World  Championship record

For results since 1991, see Scotland national under-17 football team.

The Scotland under-16s' best tournament performance was as runners up in the 1989 FIFA U-16 World Championship under manager Craig Brown. Despite leading Saudi Arabia 2–0 in the final after goals from Ian Downie and Paul Dickov, the match finished 2–2 after extra time. Scotland lost the subsequent penalty shoot-out in front of over 50,000 fans at Hampden Park in Glasgow. Some media commentators reported suspicions, which were shared by Craig Brown and former Scottish Football Association secretary Ernie Walker, that Saudi Arabia had fielded ineligible over-age players in the competition.

UEFA European U-16 Championship record

For results since 2002, see Scotland national under-17 football team.

Victory Shield
The Scotland under-16s compete in the Victory Shield tournament, which is contested annually. The competition is currently sponsored by Sky Sports. Scotland have won the Victory Shield outright on 17 occasions, most recently in 2013, and were joint champions on a further 10 occasions, most recently in 2003.

In the 2011 competition, which took place in March, Scotland finished as runners up to England, losing 2–1. They had only needed a draw to win the tournament.

Nordic Cup
The Scotland under-16s also play in an occasional Nordic Cup competition with the under-16 teams of Scandinavian countries such as Norway, Sweden and Iceland. The 2010 tournament also featured the under-16 sides of Finland, Faeroe Islands, Denmark and England.

Other Tournaments

Friendly matches
In recent years, Scotland have played a two-leg international friendly match against an under-18 side picked by the football association of Jersey. The matches are used as a warm-up for competitive fixtures and have often taken place in Springfield Stadium in Jersey's Springfield Park. Despite the age gap and Jersey's home advantage, Scotland have won convincingly in some of these matches. In other friendlies since 2008, Scotland have faced the under-16 teams of Malta, Kazakhstan, Guernsey Portugal and Spain.

Players

Current squad
The following players were called up for the 2019 Victory Shield tournament.

See also
Football in Scotland
Scotland national youth football team

References

External links
FIFA under-16 World Cup archive at fifa.com
UEFA under-16/17 European Championship archive at uefa.com
Rec.Sports.Soccer Statistics Foundation UEFA Under-16 European Championship statistics

F
European national under-16 association football teams
Youth football in Scotland